Borgarlína is the name of a proposed BRT network in the capital region of Iceland. The network has been in planning since 2015, and involves upgrading existing road infrastructure to include long stretches of separated public transport lanes. Parts of the network could later be upgraded to light rail.

See also 
 Reykjavík city bus

References  

Bus rapid transit